Lorient Agglomération (Breton: An Oriant Tolpad-kêrioù) is the communauté d'agglomération, an intercommunal structure, centred on the city of Lorient. It is located in the Morbihan department, in the Brittany region, northwestern France. It was created in January 2014. Its area is 738.7 km2. Its population was 205,765 in 2020, of which 57,412 were in Lorient proper.

Composition
The communauté d'agglomération consists of the following 25 communes:

Brandérion
Bubry
Calan
Caudan
Cléguer
Gâvres
Gestel
Groix
Guidel
Hennebont
Inguiniel
Inzinzac-Lochrist
Lanester
Languidic
Lanvaudan
Larmor-Plage
Locmiquélic
Lorient
Ploemeur
Plouay
Pont-Scorff
Port-Louis
Quéven
Quistinic
Riantec

The areas and populations (as per INSEE estimates as at 1 January 2020) are as follows:

References

Agglomeration communities in France
Intercommunalities of Morbihan